Žygimantas Skučas (born 18 March 1992, Kaunas, Lithuania) is a Lithuanian professional basketball player. His main position is power forward.

Professional career
In 2016, he signed with Lietkabelis Panevėžys and debuted in his first European competition EuroCup on 12 October versus KK MZT Skopje by scoring 15 points, grabbing 4 rebounds and helping his team to start the season with a 90–89 victory. The team also qualified into the TOP16 stage and Skučas finished the debut season with solid 9.2 points, 3.9 rebounds and 1.7 assists averages.

International career
He won four gold medals with Lithuania national teams: Europe U-16 in 2008, Europe U-18 in 2010, World U-19 in 2011 and Europe U-20 in 2012.

References

1992 births
Living people
BC Juventus
BC Lietkabelis players
Lithuanian men's basketball players
Power forwards (basketball)
Small forwards
Basketball players from Kaunas